Berlinia korupensis is a species of tree up to 42 m (138 feet) tall and 88 cm (35 in) in diameter, belonging to the Senna subfamily Caesalpinioideae of the Bean Family, and is endemic to the Korup National Park in Cameroon, West Africa. Having produced large, delicate white flowers remindful of Bauhinia, the species' seed pods can grow to be 30 cm long. Seed dispersal is explosive with the opposing halves of the pods tightening as they dry until suddenly they split and shoot seeds for a distance that can be as great as 50 metres (165 feet). It is on the Critically Endangered list as thus far only 17 trees have been found.  This is a very recent discovery, having been unknown to the outside world prior to June of 2010.

References

External links
Kew Species Profile: Berlinia korupensis

Detarioideae
Endemic flora of Cameroon
Plants described in 2009